Pecanland Mall is an enclosed shopping mall in Monroe, Louisiana. The mall was named Pecanland because the land on which the mall is located was formerly a pecan farm. The mall is on Interstate 20 near U.S. Highway 165, the two major highways in the area.

Pecanland Mall has 6 anchor stores: Belk, Tilt Studio, Dillard's, Dick's Sporting Goods, and JCPenney. The mall also features a 450-seat food court and 10-screen cinema.

History

The mall opened on July 24, 1985. 

In 2002, General Growth Properties acquired the mall for $72 million. Mervyn's, an original tenant, closed in 2005 and became Burlington one year later, but closed by the late-2010s.

In October 2012, Dick's Sporting Goods opened at the mall.

In September 2018, Sears closed its location at the mall.

In March 2019, Nickels and Dimes Inc of Celina Texas announced that Tilt Studio would open up at the mall in the former Mervyn's/Burlington. This marked Tilt's return to the mall, as its parent company originally operated Tilt Arcade at the Food Court in the late 1980s to 2012.
On August 12, 2020, Stein Mart filed for Chapter 11 bankruptcy due to the COVID-19 pandemic. Later, it was announced that all Stein Mart locations would be closing permanently.

References

External links
Official site.

 Shopping malls in Louisiana
 Brookfield Properties
 Buildings and structures in Monroe, Louisiana
 Tourist attractions in Ouachita Parish, Louisiana
 Shopping malls established in 1982
1985 establishments in Louisiana